Canadian Council may refer to:

In aviation:

 Canadian Airports Council, the Canadian trade association for Canada's airports
 Canadian Aviation Regulation Advisory Council, a public consultative body involved in creating the Canadian Aviation Regulations

In other fields:

 Canadian Broadcast Standards Council, an independent organization created by the Canadian Association of Broadcasters
 Canadian Council for Geographic Education, an initiative of The Royal Canadian Geographical Society and the National Geographic Society
 Canadian Council for Tobacco Control, a registered Canadian charity
 Canadian Council of Churches, an ecumenical Christian forum of churches in Canada
 Canadian Council of Natural Mothers, a Canadian lobby group for the rights of women who have placed children for adoption
 Canadian Council of Professional Engineers, the national organization of 12 provincial and territorial associations
 Canadian Judicial Council, the regulating body for Canadian judges composed mostly of chief justices and associate chief justices
 Canadian Meat Council, Canada's national trade association for the federally inspected red meat packers and processors
 Canadian Translators, Terminologists and Interpreters Council, a federation of provincial and territorial associations
 Canadian Unitarian Council, the national body for Unitarian Universalists in Canada
 Canadian Unity Council, a non-profit organization whose mission is the promotion of Canadian Unity and the current federal institutions
 Chinese Canadian National Council, an organization whose purpose is to monitor racial discrimination against Chinese in Canada

See also

 Canada Council